Gufo may refer to:
 Queen Mother of the West - a goddess in Chinese religion and mythology
 Gufo Temple - Chinese temple located in Shanxi province
 Gufo radar - World War II Italian naval search radar  
 Gufo (horse) - American thoroughbred racehorse